Signe Lise Howell (born 15 July 1942) is a Norwegian social anthropologist.

Personal life
Howell was born in Tinn to physician Finn Oddvar Lie  and Lise Thomassen. She was married to performance artist Anthony Howell from 1970 to 1977, and to Desmond James McNeill from 1986.

Career
Howell was a co-founder of the experimental street theatre The Theatre of Mistakes in the 1960s.

She studied history at the University of London School of Oriental and African Studies and social anthropology at the Oxford University. She investigated social structures in South-East Asia, and made field studies among the Chewong people in Malaya and Lio people in Flores in Indonesia. She was appointed professor at the University of Oslo from 1989. Among her works are Chewong Myths and Legends from 1982, and Society and Cosmos. Chewong of Peninsular Malaysia from 1984. She co-edited Blod – tykkere enn vann? Betydninger av slektskap i Norge (2001).

References

1942 births
Living people
People from Tinn
Alumni of SOAS University of London
Alumni of the University of Oxford
Norwegian expatriates in the United Kingdom
Norwegian anthropologists
Norwegian women anthropologists
Academic staff of the University of Oslo